Westminster Presbyterian Church is a member of the Presbyterian Church in Canada located in Ottawa, Ontario, Canada. 

It is situated on the west side of Roosevelt Avenue in the Westboro neighbourhood of Ottawa.

History
The architect Allan Keefer designed the Westminster Presbyterian Church, Lyon Street at MacLaren Street in 1911.

External links
Westminster Presbyterian Church

References

Presbyterian churches in Ottawa